The 2005 San Francisco Giants season was the Giants' 123rd year in Major League Baseball, their 48th year in San Francisco since their move from New York following the 1957 season, and their sixth at SBC Park. The team finished in third place in the National League West with a 75–87 record, 7 games behind the San Diego Padres.

Offseason
December 16, 2004: A. J. Pierzynski was released by the San Francisco Giants.

Regular season

Opening Day starters
Edgardo Alfonzo
Moisés Alou
Ray Durham
Pedro Feliz
Marquis Grissom
Mike Matheny
Jason Schmidt
J. T. Snow
Omar Vizquel

Season standings

National League West

Record vs. opponents

Transactions
July 30, 2005: Yorvit Torrealba was traded by the San Francisco Giants with Jesse Foppert to the Seattle Mariners for Randy Winn.
August 14, 2005: Kirk Rueter was released by the San Francisco Giants.

Roster

Player stats

Batting

Starters by position
Note: Pos = Position; G = Games played; AB = At bats; H = Hits; Avg. = Batting average; HR = Home runs; RBI = Runs batted in

Other batters
Note: G = Games played; AB = At bats; H = Hits; Avg. = Batting average; HR = Home runs; RBI = Runs batted in

Pitching

Starting pitchers
Note: G = Games pitched; IP = Innings pitched; W = Wins; L = Losses; ERA = Earned run average; SO = Strikeouts

Other pitchers 
Note: G = Games pitched; IP = Innings pitched; W = Wins; L = Losses; ERA = Earned run average; SO = Strikeouts

Relief pitchers 
Note: G = Games pitched; W = Wins; L = Losses; SV = Saves; ERA = Earned run average; SO = Strikeouts

Awards and honors
 Mike Matheny, C, Willie Mac Award
All-Star Game
 Moises Alou

Farm system

LEAGUE CHAMPIONS: San Jose, AZL Giants

References

External links

 2005 San Francisco Giants at Baseball Reference
 2005 San Francisco Giants at Baseball Almanac

San Francisco Giants seasons
San Francisco Giants Season
San Francisco Giants Season
San Francisco Giants Season
San Francisco Giants Season